Fox Township may refer to:

 Fox Township, Kendall County, Illinois
 Fox Township, Jasper County, Illinois
 Fox Township, Black Hawk County, Iowa
 Fox Township, Platte County, Missouri
 Fox Township, Carroll County, Ohio
 Fox Township, Elk County, Pennsylvania
 Fox Township, Sullivan County, Pennsylvania

Township name disambiguation pages